Progress MS-21, Russian production No.451, identified by NASA as Progress 82P, is a Progress spaceflight launched by Roscosmos to resupply the International Space Station (ISS). It is the 174th flight of a Progress spacecraft.

History 
The Progress-MS is an uncrewed freighter based on the Progress-M featuring improved avionics. This improved variant first launched on 21 December 2015. It has the following improvements:

 New external compartment that enables it to deploy satellites. Each compartment can hold up to four launch containers. First time installed on Progress MS-03.
 Enhanced redundancy thanks to the addition of a backup system of electrical motors for the docking and sealing mechanism.
 Improved Micrometeoroid (MMOD) protection with additional panels in the cargo compartment.
 Luch Russian relay satellites link capabilities enable telemetry and control even when not in direct view of ground radio stations.
 GNSS autonomous navigation enables real time determination of the status vector and orbital parameters dispensing with the need of ground station orbit determination.
 Real time relative navigation thanks to direct radio data exchange capabilities with the space station.
 New digital radio that enables enhanced TV camera view for the docking operations.
 Unified Command Telemetry System (UCTS) replaces previous Ukrainian Chezara Kvant-V as the Progress spacecraft's on-board radio and antenna/feeder system.
 Replacement of the Kurs A with Kurs NA digital system.

Launch 
On 3 February 2021, the State Commission for Testing of the Piloted Space Systems, chaired by Roskosmos head Dmitry Rogozin, approved the latest ISS schedule for 2021 and the first quarter of 2022.

A Soyuz-2.1a launched Progress MS-21 to the International Space Station from Baikonur Site 31 on 26 October 2022. Around 2 days after the launch, Progress MS-21 automatically docked with Poisk and continues its mission, supporting Expedition 68 aboard the ISS.

Cargo 
Dry cargo: 
Fuel: 
Nitrogen: 
Water:

Means of attachment of large payloads
It also delivered SCCS part of MLM Means of Attachment of Large payloads to ISS. It is a 4 segment external payload interface called means of attachment of large payloads (Sredstva Krepleniya Krupnogabaritnykh Obyektov, SKKO) According to plans, once the nadir end of SKKO was soft docked to Nauka and bolted down, the launch locks on SKKO would be released by the spacewalkers to allow it to be unfolded and extended with its joints self locking in the extended position to create a rigid frame. Then the Zenith end of SKKO would be soft docked to Nauka and bolted down. The three passive payload adapters and the one active payload adapter (i.e. active remote sensing payload like MIR Priroda's Travers Synthetic Aperture Radar) would then be outfitted. The SKKO was derived from the setup used on the Priroda module. SKKO will be launched inside the Progress spacecraft and transferred to a temporary storage location inside one of the station modules. It would be taken outside and installed on the aft facing side of Nauka during the VKD-60 spacewalk. LCCS part of MLM Means of Attachment of Large payloads was delivered to ISS by Progress MS-18 spacecraft. It was taken outside and installed on the ERA aft facing base point on Nauka during the VKD-55 spacewalk.

Coolant pressure accident
On 11 February 2023, the freighter lost coolant pressure days before undocking from ISS, with no impact to the station as cargo had been unloaded and the spacecraft had been loaded with waste to be discarded. This incident was similar to the Soyuz MS-22 coolant loop accident in December 2022. It was undocked on 18 February 2023 as per previous schedule, after which burned in the Earth's atmosphere after deorbit.

See also 
 Uncrewed spaceflights to the International Space Station

References 

Progress (spacecraft) missions
2022 in Russia
Spacecraft launched in 2022
Supply vehicles for the International Space Station
Spacecraft launched by Soyuz-2 rockets